Robert Alan Ford (born January 26, 1950) is a retired American basketball player. He graduated from Evansville North High School in 1968 and led North High School to the 1967 Indiana high school basketball championship. He played on the 1968 Indiana High School All-Star basketball team against the Kentucky All-Stars. He played college basketball at Purdue University where he totaled 1,244 points and 648 rebounds. He was the team MVP during his junior season (1970–71), leading the Boilermakers to the NIT.  He played briefly for the Memphis Tams of the ABA in the 1972–73 season, averaging 1.6 points and 1.3 rebounds in nine games played; a mid-season trade with the Indiana Pacers failed to materialize and Ford was released.  Ford spent the 1974–75 basketball season with the Lafayette Lasers of the short lived IBA. During his collegiate career, he was a 2x member of USA Basketball (National) teams, the Silver Medal-winning 1970 World University Games squad and the 1971 Pan-Am Games team.  Currently, Bob Ford is a full-time telecaster for Purdue Boilermaker men's basketball games.

References

External links
Indiana Hall of Fame
ABA statistics

1950 births
Living people
American men's basketball players
Basketball players at the 1971 Pan American Games
Basketball players from Indiana
Forwards (basketball)
Memphis Tams players
New York Knicks draft picks
Pan American Games competitors for the United States
Parade High School All-Americans (boys' basketball)
Purdue Boilermakers men's basketball players
Sportspeople from Evansville, Indiana